is a JR West Kure Line station located in Kure, Hiroshima Prefecture, Japan.

History

24 November 1935: Nigata Station opens
1 May 1946: Nibori Ferry service begins
1 June 1976: Nigata Station ceases handling freight service
1 July 1982: Nibori Ferry service ceases
1 April 1987: Japanese National Railways is privatized, and Nigata Station becomes a JR West station
1 October 1995: Under the direct control of the Hiroshima Branch, it became the jurisdiction of the Mihara Regional Railway Department.

Station building and platforms
Nigata Station features two platforms capable of handling two lines simultaneously. Trains bound for Takehara and Mihara are handled on the upper end (上り) of the platform, and trains bound for Hiro, Kure, and Hiroshima are handled on the lower end (下り). A bookstore is located on platform two.

Environs
Kure Municipal Offices, Nigata Branch
Kure Municipal Nigata Elementary School
Kure Municipal Nigata Junior High School
Nigata Harbor

Highway access
Japan National Route 185
 Hiroshima Prefectural Route 261 (Nigata Harbor Route)
 Hiroshima Prefectural Route 279 (Hiro-Nigata Teishajō Route)

References

Kure Line
Railway stations in Hiroshima Prefecture
Railway stations in Japan opened in 1935
Stations of West Japan Railway Company